"When I Love I Love" is a song written by Harry Warren and Mack Gordon and recorded by Carmen Miranda for the film Week-End in Havana in 1941.

References

External links
When I Love I Love on iTunes Music

1941 songs
Samba songs
Songs with lyrics by Mack Gordon
Songs with music by Harry Warren
Carmen Miranda songs